Mrtva priroda (trans. Still Life) is the third studio album from Serbian and former Yugoslav rock band Riblja Čorba, released in 1981.

In 1998, the album was polled as the 19th on the list of 100 greatest Yugoslav rock and pop albums in the book YU 100: najbolji albumi jugoslovenske rok i pop muzike (YU 100: The Best albums of Yugoslav pop and rock music). In 2015, the album was pronounced the 22nd on the list of 100 greatest Yugoslav albums published by Croatian edition of Rolling Stone.

Background and recording
For the first time, a Riblja Čorba album featured a song written entirely by the guitarist Momčilo Bajagić, "Ja sam se ložio na tebe". Nevertheless, Riblja Čorba frontman Bora Đorđević remained the band's main author, with six songs written by him.

The album was produced by John McCoy. In his 2011 book, Šta je pesnik hteo da kaže, Đorđević recalls how the band decided to hire McCoy:

Đorđević also states that the band was offered to record the album in one of the studios in which Deep Purple recorded Deep Purple In Rock, but refused, as PGP-RTB had just bought new equipment for their Studio V, so McCoy and Tony Taverner, who was in charge of recording, travelled to Belgrade.

Đorđević states that he did not want to put "Vetar duva, duva, duva", a short humorous song about cannabis, on the album, but was persuaded to do so by the rest of the members.

Album cover
The album cover was designed by Jugoslav Vlahović.

Track listing

2006 CD reissue bonus track

Personnel
Bora Đorđević - vocals
Rajko Kojić - guitar
Momčilo Bajagić - guitar
Miša Aleksić - bass guitar
Miroslav Milatović - drums

Guest musicians
Kornelije Kovač - keyboards

Additional personnel
John McCoy - producer
Tony Taverner - recorded by

Reception and "Na zapadu ništa novo" scandal
Three weeks after the album was released it sold 100,000 copies, which made Mrtva Priroda the fastest-selling album in the history of Yugoslav rock music. By the end of the year it sold more than 450,000 copies. Several songs became hits: "Neću da ispadnem životinja", "Pekar, lekar, apotekar", "Volim, volim žene" and "Na zapadu ništa novo".

"Na zapadu ništa novo" (named after Erich Maria Remarque's novel All Quiet on the Western Front) was the band's first song with political undertones. Young Communist League of Yugoslavia's Bosnia-Herzegovina branch demanded Mrtva priroda be banned because of the lyrics "za ideale ginu budale" ("only fools die for their ideals") and "kreteni dižu bune i ginu" ("idiots organize uprisings and get killed") from the song. Arriving to Sarajevo to perform a concert during the album tour, Đorđević had to write an explanation for these problematic lyrics. The show organizers also made him sign a liability waiver regarding the performance of "Na zapadu ništa novo".

Legacy
In 1998, the album was polled in 1998 as the 19th on the list of 100 greatest Yugoslav rock and pop albums in the book YU 100: najbolji albumi jugoslovenske rok i pop muzike (YU 100: The Best albums of Yugoslav pop and rock music).

In 2015, the album was pronounced the 22nd on the list of 100 greatest Yugoslav albums published by Croatian edition of Rolling Stone. The magazine wrote:

{{cquote|The new wave was in the attack, but, alongside it, Belgrade hard rock band Riblja Čorba was also in the attack. In 1981, their third studio album, Mrtva priroda, was released, with which the band, led by charismatic Bora Đorđević, managed to beat even Bijelo Dugme's album sales. [...] Mrtva priroda is one of the rare albums of the Yugoslav scene from which literally every song became a hit [...] the message, the music and the emotions of the band matched with what the youth wanted at that point. In terms of creativity, Mrtva priroda was the peak. All of the band's later releases were compared with that album, on which the music and Đorđević's lyrics were in perfect balance [...]}}

In 2015 Mrtva priroda album cover was ranked the 8th on the list of 100 Greatest Album Covers of Yugoslav Rock published by web magazine Balkanrock.

Covers
Serbian girl group Aska included passages from "Volim, volim, volim, volim žene" and "Pekar, lekar, apotekar" into the medley "Koktel" ("Coctail") on their 1982 album Disco Rock.
Serbian hardcore punk band Sick Mother Fakers released a cover of "Odlazak u grad" on their 1998 album Lako ćemo.
Serbian punk rock band Six Pack released a cover of "Na zapadu ništa novo" on their 2000 album Minut ćutanja.
Serbian pop punk band Lude Krawe released a cover of "Vetar duva, duva, duva" (alongside a cover of song "Dva dinara, druže" from Riblja Čorba's album Pokvarena mašta i prljave strasti) on their 2007 cover album Sve tuđe.

 References 

Mrtva priroda at Discogs
 EX YU ROCK enciklopedija 1960-2006,  Janjatović Petar;  
 Riblja čorba'',  Jakovljević Mirko;

External links 
Mrtva priroda at Discogs

Riblja Čorba albums
1981 albums
PGP-RTB albums
Heavy metal albums by Serbian artists
Heavy metal albums by Yugoslav artists